MercyMe is an American contemporary Christian music band based in Greenville, Texas. The band formed in 1994 and released six independent records from 1995-2000 before signing with INO Records and releasing their major-label debut, Almost There, in 2001. They have since released six other studio albums as well as a holiday album.

MercyMe has been awarded the American Music Award for Favorite Contemporary Inspirational Artist twice, in 2004 and 2010. At the 35th GMA Dove Awards, the band received the awards for Artist of the Year and Group of the Year, while their song "Word of God Speak" received the award for Pop/Contemporary Song of the Year; they also received that award in 2001 with their song "I Can Only Imagine". Their album "Undone" received the award for Dove Award for Pop/Contemporary Album of the Year in 2005. Coming Up to Breathe was nominated for the Dove Award for Pop/Contemporary Album of the Year as well as the Grammy Award for Best Pop/Contemporary Gospel Album.

American Music Awards
The American Music Awards are awarded for achievements in the American record industry. MercyMe has been nominated for four awards, winning two of them.

Billboard Music Awards
The Billboard Music Awards reflect Billboard "chart rankings based on key fan interactions with music, including album sales and downloads, track downloads, radio airplay and touring as well as streaming and social interactions on Facebook, Twitter, Vevo, YouTube, Spotify and other popular online destinations for music". MercyMe has been nominated for four awards.

|-
| rowspan="3"| 2011 ||rowspan="1"| The Generous Mr. Lovewell || Top Christian Album|| 
|-
| – || Top Christian Artist|| 
|-
| "All of Creation" || Top Christian Song|| 
|-
|rowspan="1"| 2012 ||rowspan="1"| – || Top Christian Artist|| 
|-
|colspan="10" style="font-size:8pt"| "—" denotes nomination was not for a work

Dove Awards
The GMA Dove Awards honor artists in the genres of Christian music and Gospel music. MercyMe has been nominated for 18 awards, winning 6 of them.

|-
|rowspan="1"| 2002 ||rowspan="1"| "I Can Only Imagine"  || Pop/Contemporary Recorded Song of the Year || 
|-
|rowspan="3"| 2003 ||rowspan="1"| –  || Artist of the Year || 
|-
|rowspan="1"| –|| Group of the Year || 
|-
|rowspan="1"| Spoken For || Pop/Contemporary Album of the Year || 
|-
|rowspan="3"| 2004 ||rowspan="1"| –  || Artist of the Year || 
|-
|rowspan="1"| –|| Group of the Year || 
|-
|rowspan="1"| "Word of God Speak" || Pop/Contemporary Recorded Song of the Year || 
|-
|rowspan="5"| 2005 ||rowspan="1"| –  || Artist of the Year || 
|-
|rowspan="1"| –|| Group of the Year || 
|-
|rowspan="1"| Undone || Pop/Contemporary Album of the Year || 
|-
|rowspan="1"| The Passion of the Christ: Songs || Special Event Album of the Year || 
|-
|rowspan="1"| MercyMe Live || Long Form Music Video of the Year || 
|-
|rowspan="1"| 2006 ||rowspan="1"| –  || Group of the Year || 
|-
|rowspan="2"| 2007 ||rowspan="1"| –  || Group of the Year || 
|-
|rowspan="1"| Coming Up to Breathe || Pop/Contemporary Album of the Year || 
|-
|rowspan="1"| 2008 ||rowspan="1"| –  || Group of the Year || 
|-
|rowspan="2"| 2010 ||rowspan="1"| –  || Group of the Year || 
|-
|rowspan="1"| "All of Creation" || Pop/Contemporary Recorded Song of the Year || 
|-
|colspan="10" style="font-size:8pt"| "—" denotes that award was not for a work

Grammy Awards
The Grammy Awards are awarded annually by The Recording Academy and honor "artistic achievement, technical proficiency and overall excellence in the recording industry, without regard to album sales or chart position". MercyMe has been nominated for one award.

|-
|  ||rowspan="1"| Coming Up to Breathe || Best Pop/Contemporary Gospel Album || 
|-

References

MercyMe
MercyMe